Tintorera  is a 1977 Mexican-British horror film directed by René Cardona Jr. and starring Susan George, Hugo Stiglitz, Fiona Lewis and Andrés García. It is based on the novel of the same name by oceanographer Ramón Bravo, who studied the species of shark known as 'tintorera' (a  shark) and discovered the sleeping sharks of Isla Mujeres. The film, along with many monster movies of the 1970s and 1980s, is very similar to Jaws. It is also known by the alternative title Tintorera: Killer Shark.

Quentin Tarantino paid tribute to this movie at the eighth Morelia International Film Festival, showing a copy from his private collection.

Plot
Steven a U.S.-born Mexican businessman, arrives in a Mexican resort village on a yacht anchored offshore. One of the local fishermen and the caretaker of the yacht, Colorado, takes Steven with him when he goes to haul in the sharks he has caught, but is annoyed to find that another shark has taken a huge bite out of one of them.

Steven then sets his sights on Patricia, an Englishwoman on vacation. They have a whirlwind romance but break up when Steven can't decide if he's in love with her. Steven is extremely jealous, however, when she begins a relationship with Miguel, a womanizing swimming instructor at the nearby resort hotel. While Steven stews on the yacht, Patricia and Miguel have sex. Then she goes skinny-dipping in the ocean and is eaten by a large  tiger shark.

The next day, Steven confronts Miguel in the hotel bar. Miguel tells Steven that Patricia was in love with Steven, but she must have returned to England. Neither man ever learns of her true fate. Miguel introduces Steven to two sisters, American college students Kelly and Cynthia Madison. They go on a double date and swim to the yacht for some skinny-dipping at the sisters' suggestion. The shark is in the water nearby, but they safely make it to the boat. Kelly and Cynthia then hop back and forth between Miguel's and Steven's beds. They all swim back to shore the next morning, and the submerged tiger shark again chooses not to bother them. When Miguel and Steven start a shark hunting business, Miguel tells Steven that they must immediately get out of the water if a tiger shark ever appears.

One night, Miguel and Steven meet Gabriella a young English tourist. Miguel and Steven take Gabriella shark hunting with them. She is appalled by what they do, but admits her feelings for them have become powerful. The three of them decide to have a triangular relationship; she'll be sexually involved with both of them, but they won't fall in love with her or with them. They tour the local Mayan archaeological sites together, then retire to the yacht for sex. The next time they go shark hunting, a shark appears and rips Miguel in half.

Gabriella is so upset that she decides to return to England. Steven, meanwhile, vows revenge on the shark, enlisting the local coastguard and fishermen in a campaign to kill the tiger shark and seemingly every other shark in the area. "I hate the bastards", Steven tells the troubled Colonado, who in turn assures him that so many sharks have been killed, the tiger shark must have been one of them. Meanwhile, unbeknownst to Steven or Colonado, the tiger shark attacks another small fishing boat and eats two fishermen.

Steven goes to a nighttime beach party with Kelly, Cynthia and two other American women. After the party ends, Kelly and Cynthia suggest more skinny-dipping. This time, the tiger shark attacks, ripping Cynthia from Steven's arms as he makes out with her in the water.  The other women make it safely to shore.

After Kelly's father arrives to take her home, Steven vows to kill the shark himself. That night, Steven attempts to lure the shark with a devilfish he's speared for the occasion.  When he spots the shark, he shoots it with a speargun, hitting it between the eyes, killing it.  Steven's fate is left unknown.

Cast
 Susan George as Gabriella
 Hugo Stiglitz as Steven
 Fiona Lewis as Patricia
 Andrés García as 	Miguel
 Jennifer Ashley as Kelly Madison
 Eleazar García as Crique (as Eleazar Garcia 'Chelelo')
 Roberto 'Flaco' Guzmán as Colonado (as Roberto 'Flaco' Guzman)
 Laura Lyons as Cynthia Madison 
 Carlos East as Mr. Madison (as Charles East)
 Priscilla Barnes as girl from bar #1
 Pamela Garner as girl from bar #2 (as Pamela Gardner)
 Erika Carlsson as Anita (as Erika Carlson)
 Manuel Alvarado as naval officer
 Alejandro Ciangherotti as fisherman #1 (as Alexander Chianguerotti)

Production
Priscilla Barnes, unknown at the time, appears towards the end of the film as a party girl who encounters the shark during night swimming.

The shark in the film was a Tiger shark. Locations were filmed at Isla Mujeres, a resort island near Cancún. All the underwater scenes were filmed with live sharks using the submarine expertise of Ramón Bravo.

Due to the censorship imposed by the Mexican government at the time, there were two versions of the film prepared - the so-called uncut version, with plenty of explicit nudity, for foreign markets, and a cut version for domestic (Mexican) exhibition. It's now possible to find both versions on DVD.

The original English dub in theatres and on video featured the voices of Susan George and Fiona Lewis, who played the two British tourists in the film. However, this dub was later lost and a new one was created with American voice actresses, which is the one used on the DVD.

Release Dates 
Some international release dates:

March 31, 1977: Mexico City premiere (¡Tintorera!)
April 7, 1977: Mexico (¡Tintorera!)
August 10, 1977: Sweden (Tigerhajarna - havets marodörer)
August 25, 1977: Italy (Tintorera: Lo squalo che uccide)
September 16, 1977: Germany (Tintorera! Meeresungeheuer greifen an)
October 30, 1977: United Kingdom general release (Tintorera) [in a double-bill with Communion, UK title of Alice, Sweet Alice]
June 7, 1978: United States (Tintorera: Killer Shark)

See also
List of killer shark films

References

External links

 Tintorera on Nanarland

1977 films
1977 horror films
Natural horror films
1970s Spanish-language films
Films based on horror novels
Films about sharks
Mexican horror films
Films about shark attacks
Films scored by Basil Poledouris
Films set in Mexico
1970s Mexican films